Smockville is an unincorporated community in Raccoon Township, Parke County, in the U.S. state of Indiana.

History
Smockville had its start as a coal town.

Geography

References

Unincorporated communities in Indiana
Unincorporated communities in Parke County, Indiana